Virtual XI (pronounced "Virtual Eleven") is the eleventh studio album by English heavy metal band Iron Maiden, released on 23 March 1998. It is the band's second and final album with Blaze Bayley on vocals. It also marks the first album to utilise a slightly modified logo, with the letters R, M, and N the same size as the other letters as opposed to them being extended. This goes on for the next few albums, until The Final Frontier, in 2010.

Background

Virtual XI'''s title is tied in with two extra-musical events: the release of the band's computer game, Ed Hunter, and the fact that the 1998 FIFA World Cup would be taking place in June of that year. Harris explains, "We figure our fans are pretty much the same as we are, with pretty much the same interests, so we thought, 'It's World Cup year in '98. Let's get the football involved in the new album.' And we were already working on a computer game at that time, so we thought, 'Well, let's bring that element into things, too.'" Prior to the album's release, the band organised a publicity tour in which they held football matches across Europe with "guest musicians and pro-footballers from the UK."

While most of the artwork in the album's booklet was taken from the Ed Hunter game, the cover was created by Melvyn Grant. According to Grant, he was asked to design something related to virtual reality, but was later asked to alter the artwork by adding a football game, the band then having decided to link the release with the World Cup. This was also the first album to feature the band's new alternate logo, with the extended ends of the "R", "M", and both "N's" removed. This variant would be used on all future studio albums, live albums (with the exception of Flight 666 and Maiden England '88), and singles up until The Final Frontier. Starting with The Book of Souls, the band's 16th studio album, the original logo was reused.

For this album some keyboard parts were performed by band founder/bassist Steve Harris whereas on previous albums all the keyboard parts had been handled by Harris' bass technician, Michael Kenney.

As with their previous world tour, several US shows on the Virtual XI World Tour had to be cancelled as Bayley had vocal issues, although the official reason was instead that he was suffering from a severe allergic reaction to pollen.

This would be the second and final studio album to feature Blaze Bayley, as he resigned from Iron Maiden following a February 1999 announcement that Bruce Dickinson and Adrian Smith, who had left in 1993 and 1990 respectively, would be returning to the line-up.

Songs
Stylistically, Bayley states that Virtual XI "was a more upbeat album [in comparison to its predecessor], because we'd survived the 'X-Factour'... we were a band and, I felt, we were on our way." According to Harris, "Futureal", whose lyrics were written by Bayley, is "about being locked up in virtual reality", and describes it as "a quite straightforward rocker but done Maiden style." Regarding the album's second single, manager Rod Smallwood claims that he "had a bit of a battle with Steve" over releasing "Futureal" instead of "The Angel and the Gambler" as the album's lead single, but "Steve put his foot down." According to Harris, "The Angel and the Gambler" "is the story of these two characters, one guy who's been a bit of a rogue, a fly by night, and an angel who gets sent down to try and put him right – except he isn't having it."

Of the album's remaining songs, "Lightning Strikes Twice" is, according to Harris, "a never say never-type song ... It's a very positive, hopeful song which you can read in lots of different ways." "The Clansman" was inspired by the film Braveheart which Harris states is "about what it's like to belong to a community that you try and build up and then you have to fight to stop having it taken away from you". Speaking about "When Two Worlds Collide", Harris says, "Lyrically, I think Blaze was trying to write about the different sort of worlds he's lived in and maybe about how his world has had to change and adapt to the world of being Iron Maiden's singer." "The Educated Fool" is, according to Harris, about "growing older and everyone expecting you to be wiser but how somehow the older you get and the more you know, the less you have the answers for any of it." "Don't Look to the Eyes of a Stranger" is inspired by Steve Harris' observation, from a parent's point of view, that "every stranger is a possible threat", while "Como Estais Amigos" is a tribute to the soldiers on both sides in the Falklands War.

After Bruce Dickinson rejoined the band, Iron Maiden continued to play both "Futureal" and "The Clansman" in concert. While "Futureal" was only performed live in 1999, "The Clansman" appeared in the group's setlists until 2003, and later in 2018 during Legacy of the Beast tour. Live recordings of both songs with Dickinson on vocals have been released officially: "Futureal" was issued as a B-side to "The Wicker Man" single, while performances of "The Clansman" can be found on the live albums Rock in Rio and Nights of the Dead. The Rock in Rio recording was also included on Iron Maiden's 2011 compilation CD From Fear to Eternity.

Four songs that were written during the sessions for Virtual XI ended up on its follow-up Brave New World: "Nomad", "Dream of Mirrors", "Mercenary" and "Blood Brothers".

Blaze Bayley recorded solo versions of "Futureal" and "When Two Worlds Collide" on his live album As Live as It Gets.

The track "The Clansman" was sampled by singer Brandy in her song "I Tried".

Critical receptionVirtual XI'' was met with mixed to negative reviews from critics. Stephen Thomas Erlewine of AllMusic commented that "on the surface, there's nothing terribly wrong with the record, as it delivers all the crunching riffs and demonic horror of their best records. The problem is that there's nothing memorable about the hooks, riffs, or songs, and there's little visceral energy to the music or production. As a result, it sounds lifeless to all but the most devoted fan." He also stated that Blaze Bayley is "a competent but faceless vocalist".

Track listing

Personnel
Production and performance credits are adapted from the album's liner notes.

Iron Maiden
 Blaze Bayley – vocals
 Dave Murray – guitars
 Janick Gers – guitars
 Steve Harris – bass, keyboards on "The Clansman", "The Angel and the Gambler" and "Don't Look to the Eyes of a Stranger", production, mixing
 Nicko McBrain – drums

Additional personnel
 Michael Kenney – keyboards on all tracks except "The Clansman", "The Angel and the Gambler" and "Don't Look to the Eyes of a Stranger"

Production
Nigel Green – producer, engineer, mixing
Mick McKenna – assistant engineer
Simon Heyworth – mastering
Melvyn Grant – sleeve illustration
Synthetic Dimensions – sleeve design, 3D imagery
Simon Fowler – photography
George Chin – photography
Ross Halfin – photography
Rod Smallwood – management
Merck Mercuriadis – management
Andy Taylor – management

Charts

Certifications

References

1998 albums
Iron Maiden albums
EMI Records albums
Albums recorded in a home studio